Paul Healy may refer to:

Paul Healy (rugby union), former player and current rugby union coach
Paul M. Healy, American business academic
Paul F. Healy, academic who has investigated the Caracol Mayan archaeological site

Healy, Paul